Karen L. Pritzker (born 1958)  is a documentary film producer, investor, and philanthropist. She is a member of the Pritzker family,  the granddaughter of A.N. Pritzker and daughter of Robert Pritzker.

Biography
Pritzker was born in Oberlin, Ohio , the daughter of Audrey (née Gilbert) and Robert Pritzker. She has two siblings: Jennifer N. Pritzker (b. 1950), a retired Lt Colonel in the Illinois State National Guard and founder of the Pritzker Military Library, and Linda Pritzker (b. 1953), an American lama in the Tibetan Buddhist tradition. Her parents divorced in 1979. In 1981, her mother remarried Albert B. Ratner, the co-chairman of Cleveland-based real estate developer Forest City Enterprises. In 1980, her father remarried to Irene Dryburgh with whom he had two children: Matthew Pritzker and Liesel Pritzker Simmons.

Her father diversified the Chicago-based family business, the Marmon Group - along with his brothers Jay Pritzker and Donald Pritzker - building it into a portfolio of over 60 diversified industrial corporations. They also created the Hyatt Hotel chain in 1957 and owned Braniff Airlines from 1983–1988. The family has been divesting its assets: in 2006, the family sold Conwood, a smokeless tobacco company, for $3.5 billion to cigarette company Reynolds American Inc; in 2007, the family sold control of the Marmon Group to Warren Buffett's Berkshire Hathaway for $4.5 billion; and in 2010, the family sold its majority stake in Transunion, the Chicago-based credit reporting company, for an undisclosed amount to Chicago-based private-equity firm Madison Dearborn Partners.

Pritzker graduated with a B.A. from Northwestern University. Pritzker worked as an editor at the magazine Working Mother before the family sold it in 1986 and has written for various publications including Success, Seventeen, Kirkus Reviews, and Newsday. Pritzker invests her wealth through an investment portfolio, the Pritzker/Vlock family office which manages a diverse asset base of emerging biotechnology, medical device companies, consumer technology products, and real estate. Pritzker also operates a venture fund, LaunchCapital LLC with a core focus in the technology, consumer and medical businesses.

In 2012, Pritzker co-founded KPJR Films with James Redford. She has since executive-produced three documentary film features: The Big Picture: Rethinking Dyslexia, Paper Tigers, and Resilience: The Biology of Stress and The Science of Hope.

Filmography

Philanthropy
Karen Pritzker serves as president and director of The Seedlings Foundation. The Seedlings Foundation, founded in 2002, has awarded millions of dollars in grants, catalyzing advancements in medical research, social services, job retraining for adults, affordable housing, and online news sites dedicated to local, factual, ad-free reporting. Pritzker and her husband donated $20 million to the Yale University School of Medicine. (including $3 million to endow a professorship); $5 million to Teach for America; $1.5 million to the Michael J. Fox Foundation for Parkinson's Research, in honor of her father who had Parkinson's disease. In 2007, Pritzker donated $1 million to build a new visitor center at the Treblinka concentration camp. Karen also funded a new website named Truth in Advertising (TinA), tina.org, that provides information about incidents of false advertising. She also serves on the board of directors of Grameen America, a nonprofit that offers low-cost microloans to women below the poverty line, as well as Grameen PrimaCare, which provides affordable health care for immigrant women.

The My Hero Project
Pritzker co-founded The My Hero Project with Rita Stern Milch and Jeanne Meyers in 1995. The purpose of the effort is to "celebrate the best of humanity and empowers young people to realize their own potential to effect positive change in the world".

Personal life 
She was married to Michael Vlock and has four children. Her husband died in September 2017. She lives in Branford, Connecticut.

References

American people of Ukrainian-Jewish descent
American billionaires
Female billionaires
Northwestern University alumni
Karen
1958 births
Living people
People from Branford, Connecticut
21st-century American Jews